Al-Marzook Field at Alumni Stadium officially known as Yousuf Al-Marzook Field at Alumni Stadium is the on campus lacrosse and soccer stadium at the University of Hartford in West Hartford, Connecticut.  In 2019 it was the home stadium for Hartford City FC of the National Premier Soccer League.

The stadium opened on October 15, 1977 and utilizes artificial turf. It was renovated in 2005.

Notable matches

References

External links
 Al-Marzook Field at Alumni Stadium

University of Hartford
Hartford Hawks sports venues
Hartford Hawks lacrosse
Hartford Hawks soccer
College soccer venues in the United States
College lacrosse venues in the United States
Lacrosse venues in Connecticut
Soccer venues in Connecticut
Sports venues in Hartford County, Connecticut
Sports venues in Hartford, Connecticut
National Premier Soccer League stadiums